The 1955 Southeast Missouri State Indians football team was an American football team that represented Southeast Missouri State College—now known as Southeast Missouri State University— in the 1955 college football season as a member of the Missouri Intercollegiate Athletics Association (MIAA). Led by Kenneth Knox in his fourth season as head coach, the team compiled a perfect record of 9–0, winning MIAA title with a 5–0 mark.

Schedule

References

Southeast Missouri State
Southeast Missouri State Redhawks football seasons
College football undefeated seasons
Mid-America Intercollegiate Athletics Association football champion seasons
Southeast Missouri State Indians football